Shri Guru Nanak Public School (often known as SGNPS) is one of the oldest schools in Jagdalpur, Chhattisgarh. This is an English medium Higher Secondary School, which was founded in June 1995. The syllabus is based on Chhattisgarh Board of Secondary Education course for the students from 9th standard to 12th standard, and for the students of nursery to 8th class, the syllabus is based on the Central Board of Secondary Education.

The Principle since the year 2015-16 is Mr. Rajeev Pathak, former head of school.

External links
 Shri Guru Nanak Public School on Facebook

High schools and secondary schools in Chhattisgarh
Bastar district
Educational institutions established in 1995
1995 establishments in Madhya Pradesh